Bình Nguyễn may refer to:

Bình Nguyễn, a Lieutenant-General of Việt Minh
Bình Nguyễn, former Vice President of Vietnam (1992–2002)